J. W. Pepper might refer to:

J.W. Pepper & Son, Inc., American company
Sheriff J.W. Pepper, fictional character in two James Bond films